Eye of the Tiger is a 1986 American action drama film directed by Richard C. Sarafian, and stars Gary Busey, Yaphet Kotto, Denise Galik, Seymour Cassel, William Smith, and Judith Barsi.

Plot summary
After serving time in prison, Buck Matthews (Gary Busey), a Vietnam War veteran, returns to his hometown to start his life over with his wife Christie (Denise Galik) and their five-year-old daughter Jennifer (Judith Barsi). He learns that the small town where he grew up is overrun by a large motorcycle gang that rides through the town in large numbers, harassing various citizens. On his first night back to his old job at a construction yard, Buck hears a woman screaming in the distance. He follows the screams to discover a large group of bikers attacking and attempting to rape a local nurse. Buck manages to chase the gang off using his truck, saving the nurse. The leader of the biker gang, Blade (William Smith), takes Buck's actions personally and begins to terrorize Buck and his family. The gang attacks the Matthews' home, beating Buck and killing his wife. This leaves Jennifer, his young daughter, in shock, as she witnessed the entire event.

The local sheriff (Seymour Cassel) refuses to help Buck, leaving him with no other option but to take justice into his own hands. Buck then calls in a favor from Jamie (Jorge Gil), a friend from prison. Jamie is a Miami-based Colombian drug kingpin whom Buck saved during a prison riot, and who was also paroled with Buck in the opening scene. Buck receives a high tech truck, equipped with machine guns and mortars. Buck's friend, J.B. Deveraux (Yaphet Kotto), a local deputy who fought alongside Buck in Vietnam, provides Buck with a history of the motorcycle gang. The sheriff is shown to be colluding with the motorcycle gang as Blade and his men give the sheriff bribes of cash to ignore their activities.

Buck and J.B. begin to retaliate against the bikers through various means. Buck uses a wire to string out onto a road to decapitate at least two of the bikers. He lures another small group to their deaths by exploding his old truck when they attack it. He shoots other gang members whom they have seen committing crimes in and around the town.

Eventually, the bikers kidnap Buck's daughter Jennifer from the hospital, forcing Buck to go to their camp in the desert outside of town. With the help of J.B., flying a bomb-dropping crop duster airplane, Buck, successfully defeats the gang and rescues his daughter. The sheriff tries to have Buck arrested, but the deputies, having enough of his corruption, rebel against him and willingly let Buck deal with him. In an explosive climax, Buck has the local sheriff killed (the sheriff seems to have framed Buck for a murder committed years earlier) by offering him as a target for the gang, and then has a one-on-one fistfight with Blade, which ends with the death of the villain when he accidentally ingests cocaine the gang is manufacturing. With their leader dead, the surviving motorcycle gang members ride away.

Buck catches up with J.B. and the other deputies and they celebrate their victory for saving the town.

Cast
 Gary Busey as Buck Matthews
 Yaphet Kotto as J.B. Deveraux
 Seymour Cassel as Sheriff
 Bert Remsen as Father Healey
 Denise Galik as Christie Matthews
 William Smith as "Blade"
 Kimberlin Brown as Dawn
 Judith Barsi as Jennifer Matthews
 Joe Brooks as Jake
 Jorge Gil as Jamie
 Cooper Huckabee as Roger
 Ted Markland as Floyd
 Thomas Rosales Jr. as Jamie's Relative
 Timothy Scott as Deputy

Production notes
The film begins and ends with the 1982 song "Eye of the Tiger" by Survivor played over the credits. The song had previously been heard in the 1982 film Rocky III, for which it was specifically written, earning it an Oscar and Grammy nomination.

Reception
Kevin Thomas of the Los Angeles Times praised the performances of stars Busey, Cassel, Remsen, Smith, and Kotto, but characterized Eye of the Tiger as "just another routine vengeance exploitation picture". TV Guide criticized the script as "an endless barrage of stale revenge-film cliches".

DVD release
Shout! Factory announced they would release Eye of the Tiger as part of a four-film Action-Packed Movie Marathon DVD set on March 19, 2013.

See also
 List of American films of 1986

References

External links
 
 
 

1986 films
1980s action drama films
Films shot in California
Films set in California
American independent films
Motorcycling films
1986 drama films
Films directed by Richard C. Sarafian
American films about revenge
1980s English-language films
1980s American films